Indonesian Athletics Association is the World Athletics recognized National governing body for the sport of Athletics for Indonesia.  They are a member of the Komite Olahraga Nasional Indonesia (KONI), the Indonesian Olympic Committee.

From September 1984 until his death in 2020, the chairman was Bob Hasan. Known also as Bung Hasan

References

External links

 

National members of the Asian Athletics Association
Athletics in Indonesia
Athletics
National governing bodies for athletics